The IEA's Progress in International Reading Literacy Study (PIRLS) is an international study of reading (comprehension) achievement in fourth graders. It has been conducted every five years since 2001 by the International Association for the Evaluation of Educational Achievement (IEA). It is designed to measure children's reading literacy achievement, to provide a baseline for future studies of trends in achievement, and to gather information about children's home and school experiences in learning to read.

Over 60 countries and sub-national, benchmarking entities participated in PIRLS 2016.

History 
PIRLS provides internationally comparative data on how well children read by assessing students' reading achievement. PIRLS collects considerable background information on how education systems provide educational opportunities to their students as well as the factors that influence how students use these opportunities. These background data include information about the following: national curriculum policies in reading; how the education system is organized to facilitate learning; students' home environment for learning; school climate and resources; and how instruction actually occurs in classrooms. Studies of reading literacy had been conducted prior to the PIRLS study of 2001, and PIRLS is the successor to IEA studies, such as the Reading Literacy Study, that started in 1970 and continued until 1991.  The PIRLS study of 2001 started the trend for cyclical testing; PIRLS has a frequency of five years.  By administering the test every five years, education systems are able to monitor their children's literacy achievement over time.  The current cycle, PIRLS 2016, is the fourth cycle of the IEA PIRLS. Like the previous PIRLS cycles (conducted in 2001, 2006, and 2011), the study will also collect extensive information about home supports for literacy, curriculum and curriculum implementation, instructional practices, and school resources in each participating country.

Cycles

PIRLS 2021 
PIRLS 2021 will be the fifth cycle in the PIRLS framework. IEA's PIRLS will continue to collect considerable background information from the assessed students, their parents, teachers and school principals on how education systems provide educational opportunities to their students, as well as the factors that influence how students use these opportunities. Trend results across assessments permit countries to monitor the effectiveness of their educational systems in a global context, and PIRLS 2021 marks 20 years of trends.

PIRLS 2021 evolves further from PIRLS 2016 in allowing countries to administer the full PIRLS reading assessment, including both PIRLS Informational and Literary (the previous standard PIRLS assessment), and the ePIRLS Online Informational (the previous ePIRLS), as one seamless digitally based endeavour. Countries may also select from two levels of the PIRLS assessment; providing students with an assessment experience better suited to their reading abilities increases student motivation and provides more accurate assessment data. All results will be reported on the same PIRLS achievement scale.

PIRLS 2021 thus offers three flexible options, enabling participants to select the administration path best suited to assessing their education system:(1) A new fully digital ePIRLS assessment, which integrates all aspects of PIRLS Informational, PIRLS Literary, and the ePIRLS Online Informational assessments; 2) The paper-only version of the PIRLS assessment, which is equivalent to the original pen-and-paper PIRLS standard assessment; and (3) The paper-only version of the PIRLS assessment, taken together with the ePIRLS Online Informational assessment.

PIRLS 2016 
PIRLS 2016 was released on December 5, 2017. It also collects extensive information about home supports for literacy, curriculum and curriculum implementation, instructional practices, and school resources in each participating country. In this cycle there were two additional initiatives: 
(1) the PIRLS Literacy assessment (earlier known as prePIRLS) is equivalent to PIRLS in scope and reflects the same conception of reading as PIRLS. Its purpose is to extend the effective measurement of reading literacy at the lower end of the achievement scale. Countries whose fourth-grade students are still developing fundamental reading skills can participate in the PIRLS Literacy assessment and still have their results reported on the PIRLS achievement scale. The reading passages and questions in common between the PIRLS Literacy and the PIRLS assessments will enable the two assessments to be linked, and their results to be compared.
(2) Initiated in 2016, ePIRLS is a computer-based reading assessment of students' ability to acquire and use information when reading online. The assessment encompasses an engaging, simulated internet environment with authentic school-like assignments about science and social studies topics. The ePIRLS online reading achievement scale enables countries to examine their fourth-graders' online reading performance relative to their performance on the PIRLS reading achievement scales.

In terms of trends, the PIRLS results for student achievement by country states that 18 countries had higher average achievement, 13 countries had the same average achievement, and 10 countries had lower average achievement; and girls had higher reading achievement than boys in 48 of the 50 countries.

The 2016 PIRLS Encyclopedia has the Education Policy and Curriculum in Reading by country. It describes the structure of each education system, the reading curricula in the primary grades, and overall policies related to reading instruction.

The ten countries with the highest average reading achievement were: Russian Federation, Singapore, Hong Kong SAR, Ireland, Finland, Poland, Northern Ireland, Norway, Taiwan, and England.

Helpful pages

PIRLS 2011 
Combining newly developed reading assessment passages and questions for 2011 with a selection of secure assessment passages and questions from 2001 and 2006, the study offered a state-of-the-art assessment of reading comprehension that allowed for measurement of changes since 2001. The international population for PIRLS 2011 consisted of students in the grade that represents four years of schooling, provided that the mean age at the time of testing was at least 9.5 years. In the 2011 cycle, prePIRLS (now known as PIRLS Literacy) was offered to assess basic reading skills as a bridge to PIRLS, for countries where most children are still developing fundamental reading skills at the end of the primary school cycle.

PIRLS 2006
PIRLS 2006 assessed a range of reading comprehension strategies for two major reading purposes: literary and informational. The student test of reading comprehension addressed four processes:

 retrieval of explicitly stated information
 making straightforward inferences
 interpreting and integrating ideas and information
 examination and evaluation of content, language, and textual elements.
PIRLS 2006 assessed students enrolled in the fourth grade.

PIRLS 2001
The IEA Progress in International Reading Literacy Study (PIRLS) 2001 was the first cycle of assessments to measure trends in children's reading literacy achievement, and policy and practices related to literacy. The study examined three aspects of reading literacy: processes of comprehension, purposes for reading, and reading literacy behavior and attitudes. 35 countries took part in the first cycle where students enrolled in the fourth grade were assessed.

United States results by race and ethnicity

PIRLS assessment
The PIRLS study consists of a main survey that consists of a written reading comprehension test and a background questionnaire.  The PIRLS Reading Development Group (RDG) and National Research Coordinators (NRCs) from the participating countries collaborate to develop the reading assessments.  The assessment focuses on three main areas of literacy: process of comprehension, purposes for reading, and reading behaviors and attitudes.  The background questionnaire is used to determine the reading behaviors and attitudes.  The written test is designed to address the process of comprehension and the purposes for reading.  There are two purposes for reading that are examined in this study: reading for literary experience and reading to acquire and use information. Each student receives 80 minutes to complete two passages and then time to complete the survey.  There are a total of 8 passage.  Four passages are for each purpose of reading.  "With eight reading passages in total, but just two to be given to any
one student, passages and their accompanying items were assigned to student test booklets according to a matrix sampling plan. The eight passages were distributed across 10 booklets, two per booklet, so that passages were paired together in a booklet in as many different ways as possible." The PIRLS target population is the grade that represents four years of schooling, counting from the first year of ISCED Level 1, which corresponds to the fourth grade in most countries. To better match the assessment to the achievement level of students, countries have the option of administering PIRLS or PIRLS Literacy at the fifth or sixth grade.

Background questionnaire 
Given to:

 Home/parents—This questionnaire includes questions about "students' early reading experiences, child-parent literacy interactions, parents' reading habits and attitudes, home-school connections, and demographic and socioeconomic indicators."
 Students—This questionnaire includes questions about "instructional experiences, self-perception and attitudes towards reading, out-of-school reading habits, computer use, home literacy resources, and basic demographic information."
 Teachers—This questionnaire includes questions about "characteristics of the class tested, instructional activities for teaching reading, classroom resources, assessment practices, and about their education, training, and opportunities for professional development."
 Schools—This questionnaire includes questions about "enrollment and school characteristics, school organization for reading instruction, school staffing and resources, home-school connections, and the school environment."

Participating organizations 
 International Association for the Evaluation of Educational Achievement] with offices in Amsterdam and Hamburg
 International Study Center at Boston College
 Statistics Canada
 Educational Testing Services in Princeton, NJ
 National Foundation for Educational Research in England and Wales (NFER) in the United Kingdom
 Reading Development Group (RDG)

Participating countries

See also 

 International Association for the Evaluation of Educational Achievement
 Programme for International Student Assessment (PISA), an educational ranking among OECD nations
 Trends in International Mathematics and Science Study (TIMSS)

References

External links 
 , official website

Reading (process)
Literacy